Calappoidea is a superfamily of crabs comprising the two families Calappidae and Matutidae. The earliest fossils attributable to the Calappoidea date from the Aptian.

References

External links
 

 
Crabs
Aptian first appearances
Taxa named by Henri Milne-Edwards
Arthropod superfamilies
Extant Aptian first appearances